In cricket, match fixing occurs as a match is played to a completely or partially pre-determined result, violating the rules of the game and often the law. In particular, players have been approached by bookmakers and bribed to throw matches or aspects of matches (such as the toss), or provide other essential information. Fixing has happened in both international - including Test matches and One Day Internationals - and domestic cricket. The ban is issued by the International Cricket Council (ICC), the sport's governing body, or by the respective cricket board(s) to which the player belongs. A ban may be for match fixing or spot-fixing. Both are misdemeanours banned under the ICC Cricket Code of Conduct.

International cricket

Domestic cricket

References

External links
ICC Anti-Corruption Code
BBC article on match fixing
Transcript of BBC Panorama programme on match fixing in 2001

Match fixing
Cricketers
Corruption
Sports betting scandals